Bayad  is a Syrian village located in Hama Subdistrict in the Hama District in the Hama.  According to the Syria Central Bureau of Statistics (CBS), Bayad had a population of 471 in the 2004 census.

References 

Populated places in Hama District